Yoshimizaka (葦見坂) is a hill road running between Takanawa 2-chome and 3-chome.

Minato, Tokyo
Streets in Tokyo